Dino Marino (born 23 May 1985) is a former Italian footballer.

Football career
He started his career at Internazionale. After played 3 games for Inter, including a match in 2004–05 Coppa Italia, Marino was graduated from the under-20 youth team and farmed to Serie B team Arezzo along with Nicola Beati in a joint ownership bid. But Marino was then loaned to Serie C1 team Pro Patria after just 1 appearance, joining Carlo Raffaele Trezzi, also from the youth rank of Inter. In June 2006 Inter bought back Marino.

In August 2006, Pro Patria bought Marino in another co-ownership deal, and Inter sold remain half to Pro Patria in June 2007. In July 2008 he was signed by South Tyrol. However in November he broke his leg (fibula & tibia) and missed the rest of the season. At the end of season he joined Serie D team Ostuni.

References

External links
Inter Archive

 Football.it Profile 
 LaSerieD.com Profile 

Italian footballers
Serie A players
U.S. Lecce players
Inter Milan players
S.S. Arezzo players
Aurora Pro Patria 1919 players
F.C. Südtirol players
Association football midfielders
Footballers from Naples
1985 births
Living people